Melody Day may refer to:

Melody Day (group), a South Korean girl group
"Melody Day", a 2007 song by Caribou from Andorra
Melody Day, superintendent of the Chickamauga City School District in Georgia, United States